Tia Paschal (born March 22, 1969) is an American retired women's basketball player. Paschal played collegiately at Florida State University (FSU).   She was a 3-year starter for FSU, from 1989 to 1993. Over her career, she helped lead the team to two consecutive NCAA Tournament appearances: in 1989-90 and 1990–91, as well as a Metro Conference championship in the 1990–91 season.

Paschal held the records for points in a game (38), free throws made (14) and attempted (19) in a game, as well as steals in a season (96) and career (269). She was also among FSU's top 10 in six season and seven career records and ranked second all-time in scoring with 1,662 points.

Professional
Paschal played with the Charlotte Sting during the 1998 WNBA season as well as abroad with teams in Germany, Spain and Sweden.

References

1969 births
Living people
American women's basketball players
People from McDuffie County, Georgia
American expatriate basketball people in Luxembourg
American expatriate basketball people in Spain
American expatriate basketball people in Sweden
Basketball players from Georgia (U.S. state)
Charlotte Sting players
Florida State Seminoles women's basketball players
Small forwards
Undrafted Women's National Basketball Association players